The Eight Bells is a grade II listed public house in Park Street, Hatfield, Hertfordshire, England. The building has a timber frame from around the sixteenth century and a nineteenth-century front.

Literary associations
The pub has associations with the author Charles Dickens. Dickens is known to have stayed there in the 1830s, and it is believed to be the pub in Hatfield visited by his fictional character Bill Sikes.

References

External links

Pubs in Welwyn Hatfield (district)
Grade II listed pubs in Hertfordshire
Hatfield, Hertfordshire
Timber framed pubs in Hertfordshire